The Dream Makers is a 1975 American made-for-television drama film starring James Franciscus, Diane Baker, John Astin, Ron Thompson, Kenny Rogers and directed by Boris Sagal. It aired on January 7, 1975 on the NBC television network.

Plot
A university professor with big dreams launches a career in the music industry, eventually running his own record label. To ensure radio stations play run his recording artists' music he illegally pays off deejays and in doing so runs the risk of destroying everything he's built.

Cast
 James Franciscus as Sammy Stone
 Diane Baker as Mary Stone
 John Astin as Manny Wheeler
 Kenny Rogers as Earl
 Mickey Jones as Jesse
 Jamie Donnelly as Sally
 Devon Ericson as Carol
 Steven Keats as Barry
 Michael Lerner as Mike
 Ron Thompson as Dave
 John Lupton as Dean Halder
 Lois Walden as Jo
 Erica Yohn as Helen
 Ron Rifkin as Herb

Reception
Steven Puchalski wrote on Shock Cinema:A boring, middle-class family man gets addicted to the fast-paced world of the music industry in this generic NBC made-for-TV movie by director Boris Sagal (The Failing of Raymond, A Case of Rape). Since the script was written by someone with first-hand knowledge of the record biz -- Bill Svanoe, from the folk trio The Rooftop Singers, who had a Number One hit in 1963 with Walk Right In -- you might've thought he'd come up with something more insightful than this heavyhanded rise-and-fall hogwash....<p>[When] Sammy is sacked for allegations involving drugs and kickbacks, his out-of-control ego is determined to find a way back on top, possibly with the help of a hungry new band dubbed Cat Weazel (Kenny Rogers and The First Edition, just before they broke up and Rogers went solo). Sammy is persona non grata though, with every shot at a fresh start quickly quashed and the leaden script explicitly informing us that Sammy is "hooked on power like a junkie," until this delusional dude hits rock bottom...<p>Every single aspect of this shallow cautionary tale feels artificial, from Sammy's nearly-overnight success to the non-stop string of cliches he slams into on the way down.

See also
 List of American films of 1975

References

External links

1975 films
1970s English-language films
1975 television films
Films directed by Boris Sagal
Films scored by Fred Karlin
NBC network original films